Sergio Reguilón Rodríguez (born 16 December 1996) is a Spanish professional footballer who plays as a left-back for La Liga club Atlético Madrid, on loan from Premier League club Tottenham Hotspur, and the Spain national team. Reguilón came through Real Madrid's youth academy in 2015 and was loaned to other Spanish clubs throughout his career.

Club career

Real Madrid
Reguilón joined Real Madrid's youth setup in 2005, aged eight. On 5 August 2015, after finishing his formation, he was loaned to Segunda División B side UD Logroñés for the season.

Reguilón made his senior debut on 23 August 2015, playing the last seven minutes in a 3–0 home win against SD Compostela. The following 16 January, after being sparingly used, he returned to Los Blancos and was assigned to the reserves also in the third division.

On 23 August 2016, Reguilón returned to Logroñés also in a one-year loan deal. Now an undisputed starter, he scored eight goals during the campaign; highlights included four past Bilbao Athletic on 2 October 2016 (5–3 home win).

Upon returning to Castilla, Reguilón was a first-choice in Santiago Solari's side, and renewed his contract on 11 May 2018. On 25 August of that year, he was promoted to the main squad by manager Julen Lopetegui.

Reguilón made his professional debut on 2 October 2018, starting in a 0–1 UEFA Champions League away loss against PFC CSKA Moscow. He also made his league debut on 3 November 2018, starting in a 2–0 La Liga home win against Real Valladolid.

Sevilla (loan)
On 5 July 2019, Reguilón was loaned to Sevilla for the 2019–20 season. On his official debut on 18 August, he scored the opener in a 2–0 success over RCD Espanyol at the RCDE Stadium.

With Sevilla, Reguilón established himself as a regular starter and won the 2019–20 UEFA Europa League.

Tottenham Hotspur

On 19 September 2020, Reguilón joined Tottenham Hotspur on a five-year deal with a reported £27.5m buy-back clause. He made his debut on 29 September 2020, in the home game against Chelsea in the fourth round of the League Cup, in which he assisted teammate Erik Lamela's equalising goal, which was then followed by a penalty shootout. Spurs won 5–4 on penalties putting them through to the next round of the competition. He made his Premier League debut on 4 October, in a 6–1 win away to Manchester United. On 21 November 2021, Reguilón scored his first goal for Tottenham − the winning goal in a 2–1 Premier League victory over Leeds United.

Atlético Madrid (loan) 
On 30 August 2022, Reguilón joined Atlético Madrid on loan until the end of the season.

International career
Reguilón was selected for the Spain under-21 team for the first time by Luis de la Fuente for the 2019 UEFA European Under-21 Championship qualifiers against Romania and Austria. He received his first call up for the full side by Robert Moreno on 4 October 2019, for games against Norway and Sweden.

Reguilón made his senior international debut on 6 September 2020, starting in Spain's 4–0 win over Ukraine for the 2020–21 UEFA Nations League.

Personal life
Born in Madrid, his parents are from Zamora. He is in a relationship with Internet celebrity Marta Díaz.

Career statistics

Club

International

Honours
Real Madrid
FIFA Club World Cup: 2018

Sevilla
UEFA Europa League: 2019–20

Tottenham Hotspur
EFL Cup runner-up: 2020–21

Spain
UEFA Nations League runner-up: 2020–21

Individual
UEFA Europa League Squad of the Season: 2019–20

References

External links

Profile at the Tottenham Hotspur F.C. website

1996 births
Living people
Footballers from Madrid
Spanish footballers
Association football defenders
Segunda División B players
La Liga players
Premier League players
Real Madrid Castilla footballers
UD Logroñés players
Real Madrid CF players
Sevilla FC players
Tottenham Hotspur F.C. players
Atlético Madrid footballers
Spain international footballers
Spain under-21 international footballers
UEFA Europa League winning players
Spanish expatriate sportspeople in England
Expatriate footballers in England